Jerseydale is an unincorporated community in Mariposa County, California.

A post office operated at Jerseydale from 1889 to 1930.

References

Unincorporated communities in California
Unincorporated communities in Mariposa County, California